Synchiropus orstom, the Orstom dragonet, is a species of fish in the family Callionymidae, the dragonets. It is found in the Western Central Pacific.

Etymology
The fish is named after ORSTOM (Office de la Recherche Scientifique et Technique Outre-Mer, now named I.R.D., Institut de Recherche pour le Développement).

References

orstom
Fish of the Pacific Ocean
Taxa named by Ronald Fricke
Fish described in 2000